The Lithuanian Swimming Championships is the national swimming championships for Lithuania. They are organised by Lithuanian Swimming Federation and separate championships are held annually in both long course (50m) and short course (25m) pools.  The two meets are the country's top domestic meet for their respective course.

The first edition of the championships was held in Raudondvaris on the 5th of July in 1931, with events at the Nevėžis River.

Editions

 As the swimming program of the Lithuanian Spartakiad
 As the swimming program of the World Lithuanian Sports Games
 As the swimming program of the National Olympic Games of Lithuania

Short course

Disciplines
Except as noted below, there are male and female categories for each event.

Long course

Short course

Lithuanian records
See List of Lithuanian records in swimming

References

External links
 LTU Swimming

 
Swimming competitions in Lithuania
Swimming in Lithuania